Under the Sky of Paris (French: Sous le ciel de Paris) is a 1951 French drama film directed by Julien Duvivier.

It was shot at the Billancourt Studios in Paris and on location around the city. The film's sets were designed by the art director René Moulaert. The song of the same name, later recorded by Édith Piaf and others, was written for this film by Hubert Giraud (music) and Jean Dréjac (lyrics). In the film it was sung by Jean Bretonnière.

Plot
Under the sky of Paris, during a day, we see large and small events that occur in the lives of several people whose fates will intertwine. A poor old lady, after searching in vain all day to feed her cats, receives an unexpected reward from a mother whose daughter she had found. A young girl, dreaming of love, refuses the advances of her childhood friend to be stabbed to death by a sadistic sculptor. The latter is shot by a policeman who accidentally injured a worker who was returning home after the successful conclusion of a strike. Rushed to hospital, the injured worker is saved through the first open-heart surgery performed by a young surgeon who has just failed his intern exam.

Cast
 Brigitte Auber as Denise Lambert 
 Jean Brochard as Jules Hermenault 
 René Blancard as Le professeur Bertelin 
 Paul Frankeur as Milou 
 Raymond Hermantier as Mathias, l'artiste 
 Daniel Ivernel as Georges Forestier 
 Pierre Destailles as Michel 
 Jacques Clancy as Armand Mestre 
 Christiane Lénier as Marie-Thérèse 
 Marie-France as La petite Colette Malingret 
 Marcelle Praince as Madame Balthazar, la voyante 
 Catherine Fonteney as La dame des invalides 
 René Génin as Le cocher 
 Georgette Anys as Madame Malingret 
 Jane Morlet as La contrôleuse des vieillards 
 Serge Nadaud as Le bijoutier 
 Guy Favières as Le malade 
 Georgius as Malingret 
 Robert Favart as Maximilien 
 André Valmy as Le docteur Lucien Evrard 
 Maryse Paillet as Madame Milou 
 Nicolas Vogel as Un gréviste 
 Wanny as Mado, la prostituée 
 Nadine Basile as La stoppeuse 
 Colette Régis as L'infirmière-chef 
 Louis Florencie as Le prêtre 
 Rivers Cadet as Etienne Lambolle 
 Henri Coutet as Le délégué syndical 
 Michel Rob as Pirate, le jeune garçon 
 Sylvie as Mademoiselle Perrier

References

External links

1951 films
1950s French-language films
Films directed by Julien Duvivier
French drama films
1951 drama films
Films set in Paris
Films shot in Paris
Films shot at Billancourt Studios
French black-and-white films
1950s French films